Cotriptyline (SD-2203-01) is a tricyclic antidepressant (TCA) which was never marketed.

References 

Dimethylamino compounds
Tricyclic antidepressants